Girrawheen was an electoral district of the Legislative Assembly in the Australian state of Western Australia from 1996 to 2021.

The district was based in Perth's northern suburbs. Politically, it was a safe Labor seat.

Geography
Girrawheen was located in Perth's northern suburbs. It was bounded to the west by the Mitchell Freeway, to the south by the Reid Highway and to the east by Mirrabooka Avenue. Its northernmost boundary was Hepburn Avenue. The district included the suburbs of Girrawheen, Marangaroo, Balga, Warwick and a large section of Hamersley.

History
Girrawheen was first created for the 1996 state election. It largely replaced the abolished district of Marangaroo. Subsequently, it was replaced by Landsdale in time for the 2021 state election.

Members for Girrawheen

Election results

References

External links
 ABC election profiles: 2005 2008
 WAEC district maps: 1996–2005 2005–2008 2008–

Girrawheen